In mechanics and geology, pure shear is a three-dimensional homogeneous flattening of a body. It is an example of irrotational strain in which body is elongated in one direction while being shortened perpendicularly. For soft materials, such as rubber, a strain state of pure shear is often used for characterizing hyperelastic and fracture mechanical behaviour. Pure shear is differentiated from simple shear in that pure shear involves no rigid body rotation. 

The deformation gradient for pure shear is given by:

Note that this gives a Green-Lagrange strain of:

 

Here there is no rotation occurring, which can be seen from the equal off-diagonal components of the strain tensor. The linear approximation to the Green-Lagrange strain shows that the small strain tensor is:

which has only shearing components.

See also 
 Simple shear
 Squeeze mapping

References 

Fluid mechanics
Continuum mechanics